The Grand Ridge Rail Trail or Mirboo North to Boolarra Rail Trail is a 13 kilometre rail trail in the Strzelecki Ranges of west central Gippsland, connecting the towns of Mirboo North and Boolarra. The route follows the line of the former Mirboo North railway line for the entire distance.

In February 2009, the trail was closed due to bushfires burning out two bridges. Since then the bridges have been replaced and the trail has been re-opened with the official ceremony held in Feb 2012.

Gallery

References

External links
 www.grandridgerailtrail.com.au
 

Rail trails in Victoria (Australia)